The Rosebud Formation is a geologic formation in South Dakota. It preserves fossils dating back to the Neogene period.

See also

 List of fossiliferous stratigraphic units in South Dakota
 Paleontology in South Dakota

References
 

Neogene geology of South Dakota